Botond Előd (born 24 October 1984) is a Hungarian actor. He has an older brother named Álmos who is also a voice actor.

Voice works

Live-action shows 
 CSI: Miami
 7th Heaven
 Entourage
 Stargate Atlantis
 Hannah Montana
 Tierra de Pasiones
 Jericho
 NCIS

Live action films 
 Percy Jackson & the Olympians: The Lightning Thief
 Harry Potter and the Philosopher's Stone
 Harry Potter and the Goblet of Fire
 Harry Potter and the Order of the Phoenix
 American Pie Presents: The Naked Mile

Animated shows 
 Naruto Uzumaki (Naruto, Animax edition)
 Bleach (manga)
 Full Metal Panic!
 Death Note
 Shaman King
 Kaleido Star
 Codename: Kids Next Door
 Love Com
 LaMB

References

External links 
 Magyar Szinkron

1984 births
Living people
Hungarian male film actors
Hungarian male voice actors
20th-century Hungarian male actors